Kappa Coronae Borealis, Latinized from κ Coronae Borealis, is the star approximately 98 light years away in the constellation of Corona Borealis. The apparent magnitude is +4.82 (4.17 trillion times fainter than the Sun) and the absolute magnitude is +2.35 (9.82 times brighter than the Sun). It is an orange K-type subgiant star of spectral type K1IV, meaning it has almost completely exhausted its hydrogen supply in its core. It is 1.32 times as massive as the Sun yet has brightened to 11.6 times its luminosity. Around 2.5 billion years old, it was formerly an A-type main sequence star.

Dust disk
In March 2013, it was announced that resolved images of at least one dust disk surrounding Kappa Coronae Borealis were captured, making it the first subgiant to host such circumstellar belt. The disk extends out from 50 AU to 180 AU, and there is an estimated 0.016  of dust.

Planetary system
In October 2007, a giant planet was found by Johnson et al., who used the radial velocity method. In 2012 it was confirmed.

This planet was assumed to be outside the habitable zone on the assumption that the star is K1IVa. Given the star's luminosity, the planet is more likely on the zone's inner edge.

The width of the circumstellar belt suggests the presence of a second planetary companion of the star, either within it or between two narrower belts.

See also
 HD 16175
 HD 167042
 List of extrasolar planets
 Rho Coronae Borealis

References

Coronae Borealis, Kappa
Corona Borealis
Coronae Borealis, 11
142091
077655
5901
K-type subgiants
Planetary systems with one confirmed planet
Durchmusterung objects